Richmondale is an unincorporated community in Fell Township, Lackawanna County, Pennsylvania, United States.

Notes

Unincorporated communities in Lackawanna County, Pennsylvania
Unincorporated communities in Pennsylvania